Super Pumped is an American anthology drama television series created by Brian Koppelman and David Levien, named for the 2019 nonfiction book of the same name by Mike Isaac. The first installment, subtitled The Battle For Uber, is based on Isaac's book and centers on the rise and fall of former Uber CEO Travis Kalanick, played by Joseph Gordon-Levitt. Also starring Kyle Chandler, Uma Thurman, and Elisabeth Shue, it premiered on Showtime on February 27, 2022. Ahead of the series premiere, the series was renewed for a second season, which will be based on a separate forthcoming book by Mike Isaac about Facebook.

Premise
The first season dramatizes the foundation of the ride-hailing company Uber from the perspective of the company's CEO Travis Kalanick, who is ultimately ousted in a boardroom coup.

Future seasons will explore other stories of businesses that have affected the culture.

Cast and characters

Main

 Joseph Gordon-Levitt as Travis Kalanick
 Kyle Chandler as Bill Gurley
 Kerry Bishé as Austin Geidt
 Babak Tafti as Emil Michael
 Jon Bass as Garrett Camp
 Elisabeth Shue as Bonnie Kalanick
 Bridget Gao Hollitt as Gabi Holzwarth
 Uma Thurman as Arianna Huffington

The first season is narrated by Quentin Tarantino.

Recurring
 Annie Chang as Angie You
 Noah Weisberg as Quentin
 Darren Pettie as Hendricks
 Joel Kelley Dauten as Ryan Graves
 Ian Alda as Peter Fenton
 Sonny Valicenti as Matt Cohler
 Mishka Thébaud as Cory Kalanick
 Virginia Kull as Jill Hazelbaker
 Damon Gupton as David Drummond
 Amanda Brooks as Rachel Whetstone
 Erinn Ruth as Olivia Lungociu
 Mousa Hussein Kraish as Fawzi Kamel
 Rama Vallury as Tahir Khan
 Hank Azaria as Tim Cook
 Eva Victor as Susan Fowler
 Richard Schiff as Randall Pearson
 Rob Morrow as Eddy Cue

Episodes

Production

Development
The project first emerged on September 18, 2019, when the non-fiction novel Super Pumped by New York Times technology journalist Mike Isaac was featured on The Hollywood Reporters list of highly sought-after intellectual property. The following month, it was announced that Showtime had optioned the television rights to the book, with the intention to adapt the novel into a limited series. Billions co-creators Brian Koppelman and David Levien were attached to create, write, and executive produce the series under their overall deal with Showtime Networks. By March 2021, the series had quietly received a series pickup, with the series given a 2022 premiere timeframe. It was later announced in May 2021 that Showtime had officially given the project a series order, with the series following an anthology format, opening up the possibility of future seasons instead of the miniseries previously envisioned. The series, subtitled The Battle For Uber in its first season, premiered on February 27, 2022 on Showtime and Paramount+ Internationally. Allen Coulter was the director and executive producer for the first episode. On February 15, 2022, ahead of the series premiere, Showtime renewed the series for a second season which will focus on 
Facebook.

Casting
In May 2021, Joseph Gordon-Levitt and Kyle Chandler were cast in lead roles. In August 2021, Kerry Bishé, Babak Tafti, Mousa Hussein Kraish, and Hank Azaria were added to the main cast. The following month, Bridget Gao Hollitt and Elisabeth Shue joined the cast in lead roles while Virginia Kull, Amanda Brooks, Annie Chang, Erinn Ruth, and Mishka Thébaud were cast in recurring capacities. In October, it was announced Uma Thurman would be playing the role of Arianna Huffington. On February 16, 2022, it was reported that Quentin Tarantino is set as the narrator for the first season.

Filming
Principal photography began in September 2021 in Los Angeles, California.

Reception

Critical response

The review aggregator website Rotten Tomatoes reported a 64% approval rating with an average rating of 6.5/10, based on 28 critic reviews. The website's critics consensus reads, "Super Pumped has energy to spare, but Joseph Gordon-Levitt's committed turn as an unpleasant tech honcho will leave many viewers feeling stuck in a particularly uncomfortable rideshare." Metacritic, which uses a weighted average, assigned a score of 63 out of 100 based on 19 critics, indicating "generally favorable reviews".

Ratings

References

External links
 
 

2020s American anthology television series
2020s American workplace drama television series
2022 American television series debuts
American biographical series
English-language television shows
Showtime (TV network) original programming
Television series based on actual events
Television shows based on American novels
Television shows based on non-fiction books
Television shows filmed in Los Angeles
Television shows set in the San Francisco Bay Area
Television shows set in San Francisco
Works about Uber